Muhammad Farms is an agricultural co-operative in Bronwood, Georgia, run by the Nation of Islam.

History
Initially founded in the 1960s under the direction of Elijah Muhammad, as part of the NOI's economic program. The intention was to create a foundation for future African-American agriculture. However, its initial operation was a money pit and the Nation sold the land. Later, the refounded NOI under Louis Farrakhan rebought 1,600 of the 5,000 acres for its renewed farming operations in 1994.

Activities
Muhammad Farms grows fruits, vegetables, legumes and grains which are then sent to major cities with an NOI presence.

See also
How to Eat to Live Diet of the NOI

References

External Links
 Official site

Agricultural cooperatives in the United States
Farms in Georgia (U.S. state)
Nation of Islam
Terrell County, Georgia